Natalia Odette Riffo Alonso (born 24 July 1971) is a Chilean politician and psychologist who was minister of the second government of Michelle Bachelet (2014−2018).

References

External links
 

1971 births
Living people
University of Concepción alumni
21st-century Chilean politicians
Women government ministers of Chile
21st-century Chilean women politicians
People from Temuco
Chilean Ministers of Sport